Andrea Blede (born July 6, 1984) is a French football player.

Playing career
Andrea Blede played for JEF Reserves and Kamatamare Sanuki from 2011 to 2015.

References

External links

1984 births
Living people
French footballers
J2 League players
Japan Football League players
Kamatamare Sanuki players
Paris FC players
French expatriate footballers
Expatriate footballers in Japan
Association football midfielders